A sensor hub is a microcontroller unit/coprocessor/DSP set that helps to integrate data from different sensors and process them. This technology can help off-load these jobs from a product's main central processing unit, thus saving battery consumption and providing a performance improvement.

Intel has the Intel Integrated Sensor Hub. Starting from Cherrytrail and Haswell, many Intel processors offers on package sensor hub. The Samsung Galaxy Note II is the first smart phone with a sensor hub, which was launched in 2012.

Examples
Some devices with Snapdragon 800 series chips, including HTC One (M8), Sony Xperia Z1, LG G2, etc., have a sensor hub, the Qualcomm Snapdragon Sensor Core, and all HiSilicon Kirin 920 devices have sensor hub embedded in the chipset with its successor Kirin 925 integrated an i3 chip with same function into it. Some other devices that are not using these chips but with a sensor hub integrated are listed below:

References

Integrated circuits
Digital signal processing
Digital signal processors
Embedded microprocessors